Zhan Viacheslavovich Bush ( born 1 April 1993) is a Russian figure skater.

He is the 2013 Cup of Nice bronze medalist, a four-time medalist on the ISU Junior Grand Prix series, and 2011 Russian national senior bronze medalist. He placed 5th at the 2012 World Junior Championships.

Personal life 
Bush was formerly known by the surname Devinski, but switched to his mother's maiden name, Bush, with the consent of his whole family. His first name has sometimes been romanized as Jean or Jan.

He was born in Chelyabinsk, but his family moved to Israel soon after and returned to Russia seven years later. He spoke only Hebrew as a child, and learned Russian when the family returned. His parents enrolled him in figure skating to improve his health.

Career 
Bush began skating at age 8 in Chelyabinsk. He was coached by Larisa Yakovleva from 2004 until 2010. He competed as Devinski until the end of the 2007–08 season.

Bush finished 17th at the 2010 Russian Nationals. In spring 2010, he moved to Saint Petersburg to be coached by 1994 Olympic champion Alexei Urmanov. He won the bronze medal at the 2011 Russian Nationals.

In the 2011–12 season, Bush began appearing in senior international events, competing at the Finlandia Trophy, Nebelhorn Trophy, and Coupe de Nice. He then competed at the 2012 Russian Championships, and finished 4th with an overall score of 223.30 points. Bush was the first alternate for the 2012 European Championships in Sheffield, England. He won the gold medal at the 2012 Russian Junior Championships. Bush finished 5th at the 2012 World Junior Championships in Minsk, Belarus. Bush placed 10th at the 2012 World Team Trophy in Tokyo, Japan.

In 2012–13, Bush finished 5th at the 2012 Finlandia Trophy. At the 2012 Cup of Nice, he was 15th in the short program but won the long and finished 6th overall. Bush made his senior Grand Prix debut at the 2012 Rostelecom Cup.

In spring 2013, Bush changed coaches to Svetlana Sokolovskaya in Moscow. He won the bronze medal at the 2013 Cup of Nice.

Programs

Competitive highlights

References

Further reading 
Irina Vorotnikova  (9 September 2011). «In the Russian national figure skating skaters from Chelyabinsk and Yekaterinburg».

Irina Vorotnikova (21 September 2011). «In the Alpine mountains begins a new season of 2011-2012 18-year-old bronze medalist Russia skater Jean Bush».

Irina Vorotnikova (23 September 2011). «Alps for Jean Bush are the same family as the Ural».

Irina Vorotnikova (29 September 2011). «Not Junior Jean Bush's debut».

Andrey Simonenko (13 September 2011). «Alexei Urmanov: intentionally throw the skater Bush recess».

Reut Golinskii and Tatiana Geyhman (5 October 2011). «Slippery ice Oberstdorf».

Tatiana Geyhman (5 October 2011). «Bush: It's difficult for a soft coach to achieve something». 

Irina Vorotnikova (21 October 2011). «Ural school of figure skating».

Tatjana Flade (23 September 2011). "Hanyu wins Men’s short at Nebelhorn Trophy".

Irina Vorotnikova (23 October 2011). «Heir to the Russian school of men's figure skating».

9 November – 13, 2011. Phase IV of the Russian Cup 2011 (Kazan). 

13 December – 16, 2011. Open competitions in figure skating, "N. Panin Memorial 2011". http://www.sportdialog.ru/mainarticles/otkrytye-sorevnovaniya-po-figurnomu-kataniyu-na-konkakh-memorial-napanina-2011

17 December 2011. «Urmanov hopes that will help Panin Memorial figure skatingcareers of his».

21 December 2011. «Alexei Urmanov: Perhaps Plushenko skating championship Russia will not be brilliant, but the level of his talent and skill will allow him to win».

Andrey Simonenko (25 December 2011). «Evgeni Plushenko will return to the championship of Russia in Saransk».

Irina Vorotnikova (19 January 2012). «Men's Free Skating of Russia. Silver skater while Zhan Bush».

27 December 2011. «Chelyabinets Zhan Bush was one step away from the podium at the Russian championships in figure skating in Saransk». http://mega-u.ru/default.aspx?c_id=3&method=NewsFullText&templateName=FullText2&s_id=1173&NewsId=32434&m_id=2

Olga Ermolina (18 January 2012). "The name of Plushenko's working on it".

Andrey Simonenko (6 February 2012). "Skater Zhan Bush learned on the ice to reveal his identity — Urmanov."

Michael Aralovets (7 February 2012). "Chelyabinsk skater won the junior championship of Russia."

Olga Semeniuk (7 February 2012). "Skater Zhan Bush won the Russian championship and set a personal record."

Cyril Levkin (8 February 2012). "Zhan Bush — champion of Russia among juniors."

Irina Vorotnikova (29 February 2012). "Winter Games of Youth II of Russia. Final figure skating competition — in March 2012 in Krasnoyarsk".

1 March 2012. «Russians Zhan Bush ranked fifth after the short program at the Junior World Championship in figure skating, which takes place in Minsk».

Andrey Simonenko (1 March 2012). «Figure skater Bush said that he was too quiet at the start of the Junior World Cup».

Irina Vorotnikova (2 March 2012). «The winner of the Student Games in Russia for the World Cup!!!»

Andrey Simonenko (3 March 2012). «Figure skater Bush is ready to act worthy of the adult world championship».

Irina Vorotnikova (4 March 2012). «As once again become a world champion figure skater from Russia?»

5 March 2012. «Alexeу Urmanov: Looking to the future, more interesting to send to the World Cup, Zhan Bush, not Sergei Voronov». 

5 March 2012. Alexeу Urmanov: "Hats off to those who have coached their children".
http://www.sport-express.ua/rest/figureskating/news/153399-aleksej-urmanov-snimaju-shljapu-pered-temi-kto-treniruet-svoih-detej.html

Andrey Simonenko (6 March 2012). «Skater Bush would be helpful to go to an adult World Cup – Coach».

Andrey Simonenko (6 March 2012). «Alexeу Urmanov: skater Lipnitskaya debuted better than Kim Yu-Na».

Irina Vorotnikova (11 April 2012). «As once again become a world champion figure skater from Russia? Zhan Bush is ready to help!»

4 April 2012. «Urals Cup of Figure Skating get spectacular».

Peter Maletin (4 April 2012). «The element of ultra-si. Alexei Urmanov». http://vip74.ru./sport/element-ultra-si-aleksei-urmanov

Valentinа Zhalkina (6 April 2012). «In a stellar track after the maestro», video. http://www.ve-trc.ru/css_news.pl?id=55398

10 April 2012. "Star Walk" for skaters Chelyabinsk

Olga Volkova (19 April 2012). unite the team».

Zhan Bush, International Master of Sport. Interview by Cyril Levkin on 12 March 2012. 

Oleg Alekseev (30 May 2012). Olympic champion Alexei Urmanov and coach: "The interest in figure skating great! A confused, then?"

Young talents in professional sport. Zhan Bush: "Favorite athlete myself)". Suggestions from fans in the new 2012-2013 season. Rate Zhan Bush - 28641 (9 August 2012). 

9 September 2012. Interview with Zhan Bush.

2 October 2012. Interview with Alexeу Urmanov before Finland Trophy.

7 October 2012. Interview with Alexeу Urmanov after Finland Trophy.

Magazine "Moscow skater" №12(2526)/2012. Alexeу Urmanov: "We just need a talent". About the World Junior Championships in 2012. Pages 8–11.

Oleg Alekseev (11 October 2012). "Ice skaters tested" (about Petersburg athletes).

8 November 2012. Alexey Urmanov: For Zhan Bush this Grand Prix will be the first in the life.

External links 

 

Russian male single skaters
Sportspeople from Chelyabinsk
Jewish Russian sportspeople
Russian people of Jewish descent
1993 births
Living people
Competitors at the 2013 Winter Universiade